Dariusz Grzywiński (born 31 March 1969) is a Polish wrestler. He competed at the 1988 Summer Olympics and the 1992 Summer Olympics.

References

1969 births
Living people
Polish male sport wrestlers
Olympic wrestlers of Poland
Wrestlers at the 1988 Summer Olympics
Wrestlers at the 1992 Summer Olympics
People from Międzyrzecz
Sportspeople from Lubusz Voivodeship
20th-century Polish people
21st-century Polish people